Recreational dive sites are specific places that recreational scuba divers go to enjoy the underwater environment or for training purposes. They include technical diving sites beyond the range generally accepted for recreational diving. In this context all diving done for recreational purposes is included. Professional diving tends to be done where the job is, and with the exception of diver training and leading groups of recreational divers, does not generally occur at specific sites chosen for their easy access, pleasant conditions or interesting features.

Recreational dive sites may be found in a wide range of bodies of water, and may be popular for various reasons, including accessibility, biodiversity, spectacular topography, historical or cultural interest and artifacts (such as shipwrecks), and water clarity. Tropical waters of high biodiversity and colourful sea life are popular recreational diving vacation destinations. South-east Asia, the Caribbean islands, the Red Sea and the Great Barrier Reef of Australia are regions where the clear, warm, waters, reasonably predictable conditions and colourful and diverse sea life have made recreational diving an economically important tourist industry.

Recreational divers may accept a relatively high level of risk to dive at a site perceived to be of special interest. Wreck diving and cave diving have their adherents, and enthusiasts will endure considerable hardship, risk and expense to visit caves and wrecks where few have been before. Some sites are popular almost exclusively for their convenience for training and practice of skills, such as flooded quarries. They are generally found where more interesting and pleasant diving is not locally available, or may only be accessible when weather or water conditions permit.

While divers may choose to get into the water at any arbitrary place that seems like a good idea at the time, a popular recreational dive site will usually be named, and a geographical position identified and recorded, describing the site with enough accuracy to recognise it, and hopefully, find it again.

Dive sites
The term dive site is used differently depending on context. In professional diving in some regions it may refer to the surface worksite from which the diving operation is supported and controlled by the diving supervisor. This may alternatively be called the diving operation control site, dive base, or control point. The professional dive site may also legally include the underwater work site and the area between the surface control area and underwater work site. In recreational diving it generally refers to the underwater environment of a dive. Where a site is named, it generally refers to the locality around a specific feature, which may be reasonably conveniently visited during a dive centred or focused on that feature. Conventions may vary regionally. In some places a named dive site may refer to a specific route with a given starting point, in others it may refer more loosely to a larger region which is far bigger than a diver could reasonably visit on dives with a common point. Such regions may later be specified in more detail as they become better known, and what was originally referred to as a single site may become several sites when they are identified and described. Where a site is named for a shipwreck, it generally refers to the known extent of the wreckage, regardless of size. Synonyms include dive spot, dive location and diving site.

Bodies of water commonly used for recreational diving
Sea and ocean shorelines, reefs and shoals are salt water sites and may support high biodiversity of life forms. Tropical coral reefs are the most popular diving tourism destinations. Rocky reefs are more widespread, and support a greater variety of ecosystems, though the local biodiversity is usually more limited. Shipwrecks are also common on some coasts, and are very popular attractions for a large number of divers. Unconsolidated sediment is less likely to be visited intentionally, though there are some muck diving sites known for interesting animals.

Lakes usually contain fresh water. Large lakes have many features of seas including wrecks and a variety of aquatic life. Depths may vary considerably, though they are shallow compared to the open ocean, and while surface water level may vary over the long term, they do not have noticeable tides, and seldom have significant currents. Some lakes are at high altitude and may require special considerations for altitude diving.

Artificial lakes, such as clay pits, gravel pits, quarries and dams often have low visibility. Flooded quarries are popular in inland areas for diver training and sometimes also recreational diving. Rock quarries may have reasonable underwater visibility if there is not so much mud or silt to cause low visibility. As they are not entirely natural environments and usually privately owned, quarries often contain features intentionally placed for divers to explore, such as sunken boats, automobiles, aircraft, and abandoned machinery and structures. Flooded mines may provide the equivalent of flooded caves with an overhead environment, though generally with a known extent.

Rivers generally contain fresh water but are often shallow and turbid and may have strong currents.

Caves containing water provide exotic and interesting, though relatively hazardous, opportunities for exploration, and are found both inland and at the coast of the sea.

Names of sites
Divers may choose to get into the water to explore any arbitrary place where conditions appear to be good enough to justify the effort, but do not necessarily record what is there, or even that the site exists, but a popular recreational dive site will usually be named, and a geographical position identified and recorded, describing the site with enough accuracy to recognise it, and hopefully, find it again.

Names for the sites themselves range from descriptive through quixotic to pretentious, as they are chosen at the whim of whoever dives there and names the site. There is often no standardisation, and the same site may be known by different names to different divers. Few sites are reliably mapped or have a published description with an accurate position, and many of these are caves or wrecks of identified ships. It is also common for a dive site to be named after a charted feature, such as a reef, exposed rock, promontory, or other navigational landmark, and like landmarks, the same name may be used for more than one dive site. Other sites are named for ecological features, like a species common at the site, or one that was seen there on an exploration dive. Sites that are frequently used by commercial service providers may be given names which are intended to promote the site to potential customers.

Popular features of dive sites
 

There are a wide range of underwater features which may contribute to the popularity of a dive site:
 Accessibility is important, but not critical. Some divers will travel long distances at considerable cost to get to a site with exceptional features.
 Biodiversity at the site: Popular examples are coral, sponges, fish, sting rays, molluscs, cetaceans, seals, sharks and crustaceans. Colourful organisms generally increase popularity of a site.
 The topography of the site: Coral reefs, walls (underwater cliffs), rocky reefs, gullies, caves, overhangs and swim-throughs (short tunnels or arches) can be spectacular. Terminology for the topography of dive sites is generally consistent with oceanographic practice, with occasional more eccentric usage. 
 Historical or cultural items at the site: Shipwrecks, sunken aircraft and archaeological sites, apart from their historical value, form artificial habitats for marine life making them more attractive as dive sites.
 Underwater visibility: This can vary widely between sites and with time and other conditions. Poor visibility is caused by suspended particles in the water, such as mud, silt, suspended organic matter and plankton. Currents and surge can stir up the particles. Rainfall runoff can carry particulate matter from the shore. Diving close to the sediments on the bottom can result in the particles being kicked up by the divers fins. Sites which generally have good visibility are preferred, but poor visibility will often be tolerated if the site is sufficiently attractive for other reasons.
 Water temperature: Warm water diving is comfortable and convenient, and requires less equipment. Although cold water is uncomfortable and can cause hypothermia, cold water sites can be interesting because different species of underwater life thrive in cold conditions, and many interesting wrecks, caves and other features happen to be in cold water.
 Currents and tidal flows can transport nutrients to underwater environments increasing the variety and biomass of life at a site. Currents can also be dangerous to divers as they can carry the diver away from the surface support or the planned exit point. Currents that flow over large obstructions can cause strong local vertical currents and turbulence that are dangerous because they may cause the diver to lose buoyancy control risking barotrauma, or impact against the bottom terrain.

Rating of sites
Sites are generally rated for quality by people who do not have an exhaustive experience of the full range of sites throughout the world, and preferences differ. Criteria used for rating may differ, and are seldom specified. It is unlikely that any published ratings are unbiased, and they are not usually accompanied by a conflict of interest disclaimer. Conditions at most sites vary from day to day, often considerably, depending on various factors, particularly recent weather. The quality of the diving experience will also vary depending on the conditions at the time.

Scuba diving tourism

Scuba diving tourism is the industry based on servicing the requirements of recreational divers at destinations other than where they live. It includes aspects of training, equipment sales, rental and service, guided experiences and environmental tourism.

Customer satisfaction is largely dependent on the quality of services provided, and personal communication has a strong influence on the popularity of specific service providers in a region.

Motivations to travel for scuba diving are complex and may vary considerably during the diver's development and experience. Participation can vary from once off to multiple dedicated trips per year over several decades. The popular destinations fall into several groups, including tropical reefs, shipwrecks and cave systems, each frequented by its own group of enthusiasts, with some overlap. Temperate and inland open water reef sites are generally dived by people who live relatively nearby.

Scuba diving tourism services are usually focused on providing visiting recreational divers with access to local dive sites, or organising group tours to regions where desirable dive sites exist.

The motivations of scuba divers to travel have been attributed to adventure, learning, escape, social interaction, stature, challenge and excitement, and while these are probably valid for most novice divers and some long term divers, the motivation of long term enthusiasts may be more complex. The development of a recreational diver from novice to experienced diver is usually associated with acquisition and improvement of skills, and is often accompanied by a shift in motivations to dive. Similarly, expectations of the diving experience, satisfaction with the experience available at different dive sites, and attitudes towards the underwater environment will change in divers who continue to dive over the longer term and relatively frequently. The desire to improve and learn for personal growth and the long term satisfaction and fulfilment derived from this learning is common in such divers. This could be an important factor informing the planning and management of diving tourism.

Regions of notable biodiversity

Temperate

The Table Mountain National Park Marine Protected Area around the Cape Peninsula is a popular diving region in the Atlantic Ocean, in the vicinity of Cape Town, South Africa, with more than 250 named dive sites, many of which have been surveyed and mapped. The Cape Peninsula marks the boundary between the cool temperate Benguela ecoregion, which extends from Namibia to Cape Point, and is dominated by the cold Benguela Current, and the warm temperate Agulhas ecoregion to the east of Cape Point which extends eastwards to the Mbashe River. The break at Cape Point is very distinct in the inshore depth ranges, and the waters of the east and west sides of the peninsula support noticeably different ecologies, though there is a significant overlap of resident organisms. There are a large proportion of species endemic to South Africa along this coastline.

The Tsitsikamma Marine Protected Area in the south coast of South Africa is another temperate region of high biodiversity and endemism, but the tourism infrastructure is not optimised for diving, as the sea conditions are somewhat unpredictable.

Tropical
Great Barrier Reef
Indonesia
The Red Sea
Caribbean Sea
The iSimangaliso Marine Protected Area is a coastal and offshore marine protected area in KwaZulu-Natal from the South Africa-Mozambique border in the north to Cape St Lucia lighthouse in the south. There is a diving resort area serving this MPA at Sodwana Bay. The recreational diving area is in the tropical Delagoa ecoregion in the north of kwaZulu-Natal, which extends from Cape Vidal northwards into Mozambique. There are some species endemic to South Africa along this coastline, but most of the species are tropical Indo-Pacific. This is one of the very few places that coelacanths have been seen in their natural habitat by divers.

Types of dive sites

Dive sites may be classified under various types, and some sites fall under more than one of these types.

Wreck dive sites

Wreck diving is recreational diving where the wreckage of ships, aircraft and other artificial structures is visited. Although most wreck dive sites are the remains of ships sunk by accident or enemy action in times of war, there are a large number of ships scuttled to create dive sites at places where the conditions are more suitable for recreational diving. The recreation of wreck diving makes no distinction as to how the vessel ended up on the bottom, though this may be of importance to the individual diver, and some wreck hunters spend large amount of time and money in searches for unlocated wrecks. There is a large overlap between recreational and archaeological wreck hunting and diving, and in some cases between recreational wreck diving and unauthorised recovery of artifacts. Some wreck diving involves penetration of the wreckage, making a direct ascent to the surface impossible for a part of the dive. Only a small fraction of the world's shipwrecks are in known positions suitable for access by divers, and their condition deteriorates over time.

Reef dive sites

Coral reef areas

Rocky reefs

Cave dive sites

Cave diving is underwater diving in water-filled caves. It may be considered an extreme sport due to the range of hazards and the difficulty of mitigating them to an acceptable level. The equipment used varies depending on the circumstances, and ranges from breath hold to surface supplied, but almost all cave diving is done using scuba equipment, often in specialised configurations. Recreational cave diving is generally considered to be a type of technical diving due to the lack of a free surface during large parts of the dive, and often involves decompression.

A distinction is made by recreational diver training agencies between cave diving and cavern diving, where cavern diving is deemed to be diving in those parts of a cave where the exit to open water can be seen by natural light. An arbitrary distance limit to the open water surface may also be specified. There are relatively few practitioners of cave diving. This is due in part to the specialized equipment and skill sets required, and in part because of the high potential risks due to the specific environment. Despite these risks, water-filled caves attract scuba divers, cavers, and speleologists due to their often unexplored nature, and present divers with a technical diving challenge. Underwater caves have a wide range of physical features, and can contain fauna not found elsewhere.

Artificial reefs
 
 
An artificial reef is a human-created underwater structure, typically built to promote marine life in areas with a generally featureless bottom, to control erosion, block ship passage, block the use of trawling nets, or improve surfing.

Many reefs are built using objects that were built for other purposes, such as by sinking oil rigs (through the Rigs-to-Reefs program), scuttling ships, or by deploying rubble or construction debris. Other artificial reefs are purpose-built (e.g. the reef balls) from PVC or concrete. Shipwrecks may become artificial reefs when preserved on the seafloor. Jetties and breakwaters are secondarily artificial reefs. Regardless of construction method, artificial reefs generally provide hard surfaces where algae and sessile ebibenthic invertebrates such as barnacles, corals, and oysters attach; the accumulation of attached marine life in turn provides intricate habitat and food for mobile benthic invertebrates and assemblages of fish.

Occasionally sculpture works have been placed underwater singly or in groups, as attractions for divers, and they also function as artificial reefs.

Quarry dive sites

 
Scuba diving quarries are depleted or abandoned rock quarries that have been allowed to fill with ground water, and rededicated to the purpose of scuba diving. 
They may offer deep, clean, clear, still, fresh water with excellent visibility, or low visibility in turbid water from surface runoff. They have no currents or undertow. They are often used as training sites for new divers, where classes and certification dives are carried out. Many have a dive shop on site to rent out equipment and sell air fills and diving equipment. Lodging or camping areas may be available on site.

Quarries in stone may have clear water, with greater visibility than in many inland lakes. Ground water is the primary source of the water that fills these quarries once they are no longer pumped out for mining operations. Many quarry mining operations are located in areas where filling from other, less clean sources, such as rivers and surface runoff of rainwater is not as likely.

Over time, most quarries tend to be contaminated with erosion products and nutrients from surface runoff, causing many to develop a green tint due to algae growth, and accumulations of silt on the bottoms and other surfaces.

Fresh water scuba diving does not require much difference in equipment from diving in the sea. In those temperatures dry suit diving is recommended, but in warmer temperatures, wetsuits may be sufficient. Diving in clean fresh water generally requires less post dive maintenance.

The operators of scuba diving quarries may add objects or debris fields to the bottom of the quarry for divers to explore while scuba diving. Mostly these are man made objects such as boats, cars, and trucks. Some quarries have such large objects as school buses, small buildings, or commercial airliners on the bottom. These sites may be mapped out and marked with guide lines under the water, particularly if visibility is poor.

The owners or operators of quarries may stock the quarry with fish to provide entertainment for divers. These are commonly the same species of fish that thrive naturally in local lakes and rivers, but some quarries are stocked with more exotic fish. The ecology is usually very limited.

Environmental impact of recreational diving

The environmental impact of recreational diving is the effects of diving tourism on the marine environment. Usually these are considered to be adverse effects, and include damage to reef organisms by incompetent and ignorant divers, but there may also be positive effects when the environment is recognised by the local communities to be worth more in good condition than degraded by inappropriate use, which encourages conservation efforts.

During the 20th century recreational scuba diving was considered to have generally low environmental impact, and was consequently one of the activities permitted in most marine protected areas. Since the 1970s diving has changed from an elite activity to a more accessible recreation, marketed to a very wide demographic. To some extent better equipment has been substituted for more rigorous training, and the reduction in perceived risk has shortened minimum training requirements by several training agencies. Training has concentrated on an acceptable risk to the diver, and paid less attention to the environment. The increase in the popularity of diving and in tourist access to sensitive ecological systems has led to the recognition that the activity can have significant environmental consequences.

Scuba diving has grown in popularity during the 21st century, as is shown by the number of certifications issued worldwide, which has increased to about 23 million by 2016 at about one million per year. Scuba diving tourism is a growth industry, and it is necessary to consider environmental sustainability, as the expanding impact of divers can adversely affect the marine environment in several ways, and the impact also depends on the specific environment. Tropical coral reefs are more easily damaged by poor diving skills than some temperate reefs, where the environment is more robust due to rougher sea conditions and fewer fragile, slow-growing organisms. The same pleasant sea conditions that allow development of relatively delicate and highly diverse ecologies also attract the greatest number of tourists, including divers who dive infrequently, exclusively on vacation and never fully develop the skills to dive in an environmentally friendly way. Low impact diving training has been shown to be effective in reducing diver contact.

Environmental impact can expand in scope when a destination is commercially developed to provide more facilities to encourage the expansion of tourism.

References

External links